AS Montigny-le-Bretonneux (Association Sportive de Montigny-le-Bretonneux) are a French football club founded in 1974.  They currently play in D1 Féminine and are based in Montigny-le-Bretonneux.

History
The club was founded in 1974 and won promotion to D1 Féminine following the conclusion of the 2008–2009 season.

Honours
 D2 Féminine Champion: 2009
 Coupe de Paris Winners: 2005, 2007, 2009
 Coupe des Yvelines Winners: 1992, 1993, 1994, 1997, 2003, 2005, 2007

References

External links
 Official website 

Montigny-le-Bretonneux
Association football clubs established in 1974
1974 establishments in France
Montigny-le-Bretonneux
Montigny-le-Bretonneux
Montigny-le-Bretonneux